The Ulungarat Formation is a geologic formation in Alaska. It preserves fossils dating back to the Devonian period.

See also

 List of fossiliferous stratigraphic units in Alaska
 Paleontology in Alaska

References
 

Devonian Alaska
Devonian northern paleotropical deposits